Jacob "Stitch" Duran (born December 29, 1951) is a professional cutman who works in boxing and mixed martial arts fights.  He is of Mexican descent and grew up in Planada, California.

Career

Background
Duran once owned and ran a boxing and kickboxing school in Fairfield, California. He was also one of the first International Kickboxing Federation promoters in California holding his first promotion back in October, 1992. Duran trained and produced several of the first IKF Amateur Champions such as Randy "Buzzman" Bussart, Mike "Mohamid" Duran, John "Psyco" Parker and Andy "The Sandman" Sanchez before furthering his career in professional boxing and mixed martial arts.

Boxing
Duran has worked on the Klitschko brothers and Andre Ward and more recently Tyson Fury.

On November 23, 2014 Duran was in the corner of Chris Algieri when he took on Manny Pacquiao for the WBO welterweight title at Cotai Arena, Venetian Resort, Macao, Macao S.A.R., China.

On May 29, 2015, Duran was in the corner of Chris Algieri once again when he took on Amir Khan for the WBC Silver Welterweight title at The Barclays Center, Brooklyn, New York.

Duran has appeared as a cut-man in three films of the Rocky film series. In the sixth film, Rocky Balboa, he plays the cut-man for Rocky's opponent, Mason "The Line" Dixon (played by real-life boxer Antonio Tarver). In the seventh film, Creed, he portrays himself in a supporting role. When Donnie Creed finally convinces Rocky to train him, Rocky surprises Creed with a corner team, in which Duran is included. During the fight against "Pretty" Ricky Conlan, Creed has been blinded in one eye due to swelling. When Creed is asked by the ringside doctor how many fingers is he holding up, Duran taps the answer on Creed's neck, which lets the fight continue. He reprised his role in its sequels, Creed II and Creed III.

Mixed martial arts
In the UFC, Duran was assigned to many of the top fights, working with fighters such as Mirko Filipović, Lyoto Machida, Forrest Griffin and Cain Velasquez.

He had a cameo role in the Kevin James MMA movie, Here Comes the Boom.

On July 21, 2015 Duran announced via Twitter that he was let go from his job with the UFC due to comments he made about the organization's Reebok sponsorship deal.  Many UFC fighters publicly expressed their disappointment in Duran's firing, citing him as one of the best cutmen in the business.

Duran began working with WSOF on August 1, 2015, starting with World Series of Fighting 22: Palhares vs. Shields. In March 2016 Duran signed a contract to join Bellator MMA as a cutman.

References

Living people
People from Merced, California
Boxing people
Mixed martial arts people
Cutmen
1951 births
American people of Mexican descent